Kainipura is a small village in the Kendujhar District of Odisha, India. It lies at a distance of 5 km. from Anandapur, 80 km. from the district headquarters 'Kendujhar' and 160 km. from Bhubaneswar, the state capital.

It is a village within the Ghasipura Block of Anandapur Subdivision. The people of the village are Hindus. Most of the people depend on various types of business, rest are farmers and a few work in government and private sectors.

The neighbourhood villages are Sailong to the north, Chaumuhin to the south-west and Ghasipura to the north-east.

Places of interest

Kalpeshwar Temple
It is a temple of Lord Shiva, located at the beginning of the village. The specialty of this temple is that it has been stood on a pond. Shiva Ratri is grandly celebrated in this village. All the villagers come to the temple for "Darshan" everyday especially on Monday and offer their obeisances to Lord Mahadev regardless any caste. Every evening of Monday the villagers, congregate at the Temple and do Hari Nama Sankirtan with a prayer to make the World peaceful.

Shri Aurobindo Ashram
It is a beautiful place of this village. Here, a memorial of Sri Aurobindo containing his relics has been built. Various devotional activities are conducted here throughout the year.

References

External links
http://kendujhar.nic.in

Villages in Kendujhar district